John Hildrop (30 December 1682 – 18 January 1756) was an English cleric, known as a religious writer and essayist. Hildrop authored one of the earliest works on animal rights.

Life
Hildrop was born in Petersfield, Hampshire, the son of William Hildrop. He was educated at St John's College, Oxford, where he graduated B.A. on 7 July 1702, M.A. on 8 June 1705, B.D. and D.D. on 9 June 1743.

On 14 April 1703 Hildrop was presented to the mastership of the Marlborough Royal Free Grammar School by Thomas Bruce, 2nd Earl of Ailesbury; he was also rector of Maulden, Bedfordshire. He resigned the mastership on 4 December 1733, and the rectory on 23 March 1734. On 13 April 1734 he was instituted to the rectory of Wath-juxta-Ripon on the presentation of Charles, Lord Bruce, whose chaplain he was.

In 1740 Hildrop became one of the regular contributors to the Weekly Miscellany. He died on 18 January 1756. He was a friend and correspondent of Zachary Grey.

Animal rights
Hildrop authored Thoughts Upon the Brute-Creation, in 1742. The book aimed to defend animals against abuse and to demonstrate their place in Biblical creation. The book strongly criticized and rejected the view held by French Jesuit Guillaume-Hyacinthe Bougeant that animals have no reason, moral status or souls.

It has been described as the "earliest premodern zoophile treatise" and "one of the earliest pleas for animal rights".

Works
Under the pseudonyms "Phileleutherus Britannicus" and "Timothy Hooker", and anonymously, Hildrop published satirical essays, mainly directed against the Deists. Some of these were reprinted as The Miscellaneous Works of John Hildrop, D.D., London, 1754, 2 vols. and comprise:

 An Essay for the better Regulation and Improvement of Free-Thinking. 
 An Essay on Honour.
 Free Thoughts upon the Brute Creation or an Examination of Father Bougeant's "Philosophical Amusement", an attempt to prove that lower animals have souls in a state of degradation consequent upon the fall of man. 
 A Modest Apology for the Ancient and Honourable Family of the Wrongheads. 
 A Letter to a Member of Parliament containing a Proposal for bringing in a Bill to revise, amend, or repeal certain obsolete Statutes commonly called the Ten Commandments. This is a jeu d'esprit, on its first appearance attributed to Jonathan Swift. It was reprinted in 1834, London.
 The Contempt of the Clergy considered, an argument for the removal of the Church from state control. 
 Some Memoirs of the Life of Simon Shallow.

Other work by Hildrop are:

 Reflections upon Reason, London, 1722, a satire on free-thinking, attributed at first to Francis Gastrell, and discussed by Thomas Morgan in Enthusiasm in Distress, London, 1722.
 A Caveat against Popery; being a seasonable Preservative against Romish Delusions and Jacobitism now industriously spread throughout the Nation, London, 1735.
 A Commentary upon the Second Psalm, London, 1742.

Notes

External links
Attribution

1682 births
1756 deaths
Doctors of Divinity
English animal rights scholars
18th-century English Anglican priests
English essayists
English satirists
People from Petersfield